The 2020–21 Macedonian Third Football League was the 29th season of the third-tier football league in North Macedonia, since its establishment.

The season was interrupted on 22 April 2021 due to financial difficulties of many clubs related to a mandatory pre-match COVID-19 test.

North

Table 
<noinclude>

South

Table

East

Table

West

Table

Southwest

Table

See also 
 2020–21 Macedonian Football Cup
 2020–21 Macedonian First Football League
 2020–21 Macedonian Second Football League

References 

Macedonian Third Football League seasons
North Macedonia 3
3